The Colvos Store, also known as the Kress Store and Belcher Home, is a combination residence and commercial building in Vashon, Washington. It was added to the National Register of Historic Places on August 10, 2000.

History

The Colvos Store was built in 1923 by  John Trones, an immigrant from Norway, and Gustav Parker. A garage (since demolished) and addition to the rear apartment were added in the 1930s.

Trones, having bought out Parker's interested in the store, operated it himself for several years before selling it to the Tellvik family in 1927. Mr. Tellvik added the garage which operated in conjunction with a Shell Oil Company gas pump. The store passed to several families in the 1930s: from the Tellviks to the Townes to the Sextons. In 1938, Mr. and Mrs. Guy Kress bought and renamed the store "Kress Store", operating it until 1943 when war rationing and declining business led the Kresses to close the store.

After falling into disrepair, the building was rehabilitated as a residence and studio in 1985, restoring the facade to its original appearance. In 1994, it was discovered that the original 700 gallon gasoline storage tank was still underground; it was removed and remediation actions were taken to remove contaminants from the soil.

References

		
National Register of Historic Places in King County, Washington
Early Commercial architecture in the United States
Buildings and structures completed in 1923